Grand Rabbi Dovid Biderman (1746-1814) of Lelów was the founder of the Lelov Hassidic dynasty. He is commonly referred to as "Reb Dovid Lelover".

Biography
Rabbi Dovid of Lelov was a disciple of the Seer of Lublin, a disciple of Rabbi Elimelech of Lizhensk, who was a disciple of the Magid of Mezritsh, the successor to and leading disciple of the Baal Shem Tov, the founder of Hasidism.

There is a Hasidic legend that Napoleon Bonaparte asked Rabbi Dovid of Lelov if he would be successful in his conquest of Russia.  The rebbe told the Emperor that he would not. After Napoleon's defeat, he allegedly passed through Lelov and told the Rebbe that he was indeed correct. He then gave the Rebbe his velvet cloak. The Hasidim say that Rabbi Moshe of Lelov, the son of Rabbi Dovid, took the cloak to Jerusalem with him, and made the cover for the Holy Ark in his synagogue from it.

References

External links
 Migdal Dovid biography written by Rabbi Mordechai Bruckman and republished by Rabbi Shlomo Zev Zweigenhaft.
 Kodesh Hilulim biography written by Rabbi Moshe Yair Weinstock
 Reb Dovid Lelover's Special Kol Nidre on Stitcher.com.
 Rav Dovid Lelover and the Rebbe Rayatz of Chabad zy"a by Rabbi Yehoshua Rubenstein on yutorah.org
 Reb Dovid of Lelov - Is It A Crime To Favor Your Own Child? on "revach.net"

Jewish Polish history
Orthodox Judaism in Poland
1745 births
1814 deaths